Mood Elevator is the second album by the Winder, Georgia-based singer-songwriter Jack Logan, recorded in conjunction with a group of musicians known as Liquor Cabinet. It was released on January 16, 1996, on both Medium Cool Records (a Twin/Tone imprint) and Restless Records. As of 1999, it had sold 12,000 copies.

Background and recording
Logan began writing songs in the 1980s, when virtually no one but him and his close friends knew about his musical career. He became famous after he was introduced to Peter Jesperson, the former manager of the Replacements, by Peter Buck, who picked 42 of his favorite songs of the hundreds Logan had written at that point. These songs were then released on Twin/Tone Records, in the form of the 1994 album Bulk. This same pool of songs was tapped into for the 17 tracks on Mood Elevator. With regard to songwriting, Logan has said he considers his own life too uninteresting to write songs about, and so focuses on writing songs based on fictional characters instead.

Unlike Logan's debut album, Bulk, the 17 songs on Mood Elevator were recorded in a 16-track studio that had been set up in a friend's barn in the small town of Royal Center, Indiana. During the first night of recording, Logan recalls wanting to test out the equipment, after which a member of Liquor Cabinet soon wrote a guitar part. Logan then wrote some lyrics to go with it, and the session ended up producing three of Mood Elevators songs, which Logan wanted to record then because he was "aching to go". Logan and Liquor Cabinet recorded a total of 36 songs in 10 days during the sessions. Half the album's songs were written prior to the start of recording, and the other half were written in the studio.

Production
The album was co-produced by Peter Jesperson, who originally discovered Logan and picked out his favorite songs out of more than 600 to release as Logan's debut album, Bulk. This became Logan's big break, leading to appearances on The Today Show and Late Night With Conan O'Brien. The other producer on Mood Elevator was Kelly Keneipp, who also performed guitar and keyboard on the album.

Single
The album's first single was the song "Neon Tombstone", for which Logan also animated a video.

Critical reception
Mood Elevator, like Bulk, received overwhelmingly favorable reviews from critics, including a four-star review from Rolling Stone, which they had also awarded to Bulk. It was also reviewed favorably in People, in which its music was described as almost identical to that of Bulk, and which concluded, "Logan and company may not get high marks for originality, but something's working here." Other favorable reviews included one in SF Weekly, where James Sullivan wrote that on Mood Elevator, "He [Logan] and his group identify the finer points of rock's more indulgent styles and condense them into hard, memorable nuggets," and one in the Boston Phoenix, which described the album's songs as "fascinating fragments of stories and thoughts that are too real to ignore." This critical acclaim led the Georgia House of Representatives to pass a bill commending Logan and Liquor Cabinet on March 15, 1996. Geoffrey Himes wrote in the Washington Post that Mood Elevator "...lacks the breathtaking breadth of "Bulk," but it does boast half a dozen of Logan's finest efforts", and cited "Just Babies" and "Vintage Man" as among the album's best songs.

Track listing
 Teach Me The Rules
 Unscathed
 Chinese Lorraine
 When It All Comes Down
 My New Town
 Ladies And Gentlemen
 Just Babies
 Sky Won't Fall
 No Offense
 Another Life
 Estranged
 Neon Tombstone
 What's Tickling You
 What Was Burned
 Vintage Man
 Suicide Doors
 Bleed

Personnel
David Barbe-	 Editing, Engineer, Mixing
John Fields-	 Mastering, Mixing
Michael Gibson-	 Composer
Peter Jesperson-	 Producer
Kelly Keneipp-	 Composer, Guitar, Guitar (Acoustic), Guitar (Electric), Guitar (Rhythm), Piano, Producer
Jack Logan-	 Artwork, Composer, Primary Artist, Vocals, Vocals (Background)
Jennifer Ménard-	 Photography
Dave Philips-	 Composer, Guitar, Guitar (Acoustic), Guitar (Electric), Guitar (Rhythm)
Aaron Phillipps-	 Drums
Aaron Phillips-	 Composer
Jamie Rouch-	 Engineer
Terry Rouch-	 Composer, Guitar, Guitar (Electric), Maracas, Percussion, Vocals (Background)
Eric Sales-	 Bass, Composer, Guitar, Percussion, Vocals (Background)
Jay Smiley-	 Photography
Paul Stark-	 Engineer, Mastering

References

Restless Records albums
1996 albums
Jack Logan albums